The following is a list of all IFT-licensed over-the-air television stations broadcasting in the Mexican state of Chiapas. There are 31 television stations in Chiapas.

List of television stations

|-

|-

|-

|-

|-

|-

|-

|-

|-

|-

|-

|-

|-

|-

|-

|-

|-

|-

|-

|-

|-

|-

|-

|-

|-

|-

|-

|-

|-

|-

|-

References

Television stations in Chiapas
Chiap